Peacemaker is a BBC Books original novel written by James Swallow and based on the long-running science fiction television series Doctor Who. It features the Tenth Doctor and Martha Jones. It was published on 26 December 2007 alongside The Pirate Loop and Wishing Well.

Audiobook
An abridged double CD audiobook was released in July 2008 by BBC Audio. It is read by Will Thorp, who played Toby Zed in the two-part story "The Impossible Planet"/"The Satan Pit".

See also

Whoniverse

References

External links

2007 British novels
2007 science fiction novels
New Series Adventures
Tenth Doctor novels
Novels by James Swallow